Raja Manthreelage Thilak Rajapaksha (born 2 May 1971) is a Sri Lankan physician, army officer, politician and Member of Parliament.

Rajapaksha was born on 2 May 1971. He served in the Sri Lanka Army Medical Corps. He was head of the Ambagahawella Regional Hospital and the Ampara Health Officer’s Office and director of Ampara Regional Health Services Office. He is a member of Viyathmaga (Path of the Learned), a pro-Rajapaksa, nationalist group of academics, businesspeople and professionals.

Rajapaksha contested the 2020 parliamentary election as a Sri Lanka People's Freedom Alliance electoral alliance candidate in Ampara District and was elected to the Parliament of Sri Lanka.

References

1971 births
Living people
Members of the 16th Parliament of Sri Lanka
Sinhalese military personnel
Sinhalese physicians
Sinhalese politicians
Sri Lanka Army Medical Corps officers
Sri Lankan Buddhists
Sri Lanka People's Freedom Alliance politicians
Sri Lanka Podujana Peramuna politicians